Sun Leads Me On is the second studio album by Canadian indie rock band Half Moon Run. It was released through Indica Records in Canada on October 23, 2015, and through Glassnote/Universal in the rest of the world. The lead single, "Trust", was released on August 7, 2015.

Track listing

Charts

Personnel

Half Moon Run
Devon Portielje
Dylan Phillips
Isaac Symonds
Conner Molander

Additional musicians
Quatuor Quatres Ailes – string quartet
Tazmyn Eddy – trumpet, flugelhorn
Alex Héon-Goulet – flute

Production
Jim Abbis – producer
Barny Barnicott – mixing
Greg Calbi – mastering
Yani Clarke – photography
Ross Stirling – layout and design
Ian Dowling – engineer
Sam Bidinost – assistant
Mike Gavriel – assistant

References

2015 albums
Half Moon Run albums
Indica Records albums